Anthony John Trenga (born 1949) is a Senior United States district judge of the United States District Court for the Eastern District of Virginia as well as a judge on the Foreign Intelligence Surveillance Court.

Education
Trenga was born in Wilmerding, Pennsylvania.  He graduated from Mercersburg Academy in 1967 and received an Artium Baccalaureus degree from Princeton University in 1971. He received a Juris Doctor from the University of Virginia School of Law in 1974 and a LL.M from Duke University Law School. He was a law clerk to Judge Ted Dalton of the United States District Court for the Western District of Virginia from 1974 to 1975.

Career
From 1975 to 1987, Trenga was in private practice in Washington, D.C. with the law firm Sachs, Greenebaum & Tayler, becoming a partner in 1982. He was managing partner at Hazel & Thomas in Alexandria, Virginia from 1987 to 1998, and back in  Washington, D.C. from 1998 to 2008 with Miller & Chevalier. He is a fellow of the American College of Trial Lawyers and the International Society of Barristers and a member of the American Law Institute.

Federal judicial service
Trenga is a United States District Judge of the United States District Court for the Eastern District of Virginia in Alexandria. Trenga was nominated by President George W. Bush on July 17, 2008, to a seat vacated by Walter DeKalb Kelley Jr. He was confirmed by the United States Senate on September 26, 2008, and received his commission on October 14, 2008. Trenga assumed senior status on June 1, 2021.

Notable cases
In October 2009, Trenga set aside the jury conviction of two top salespeople at Teach Me to Trade, a part of Whitney Information Network, which uses infomercials and hotel seminars across the country to sell courses and software on making money in the stock market. In a 51-page ruling, Trenga said prosecutors failed to show Utah residents Linda Woolf and David Gengler had been part of any fraud scheme.

On March 24, 2017, Trenga was the first federal judge to rule in favor of the Trump administration's executive order that limits travel from six Muslim-majority countries.

On September 4, 2019, Trenga ruled that the United States government's watchlist of “known or suspected terrorists” violates the constitutional rights of those listed on it.

On September 24, 2019, Trenga set aside the conviction of Bijan Khan, business partner of Donald Trump's former National Security Advisor Michael Flynn, on acting as an agent for a foreign power without notifying the Justice Department.

In May 2019, Trenga ordered Chelsea Manning to be jailed for civil contempt for her refusal to testify before a grand jury pursuant to a subpoena. This came a week after Manning was freed after 62 days in jail for her defiance of a previous grand jury subpoena. In March 2020, Trenga rescinded his order directing the jailing of Manning, after she attempted to kill herself the day before. Trenga ordered that Manning pay $256,000 in fines that had accumulated over the course of her confinement.

References

Sources

1949 births
Living people
21st-century American judges
American people of Italian descent
Judges of the United States District Court for the Eastern District of Virginia
Judges of the United States Foreign Intelligence Surveillance Court
Mercersburg Academy alumni
People from Wilkinsburg, Pennsylvania
Princeton University alumni
United States district court judges appointed by George W. Bush
University of Virginia School of Law alumni